The Boone Santa Fe Railroad Depot, at 100 Baker Ave. in Boone, Colorado, was listed on the National Register of Historic Places in 1997.

It has also been known as Boone Town Hall as the city offices were moved there in 1996 upon damage to its main town hall building.

It is a railway station and shipping point for the Atchison, Topeka and Santa Fe Railway's main line running through southern Colorado.

It was deemed significant as representing "the impact that railroads had on a town's growth and development" and for its architectural significance: "This well-preserved building is one of the few surviving wood frame combination depots still at its original location. The Boone Depot was one of two otherwise standard structures [of the Santa Fe Railway in Southern Colorado] known to have an enlarged operator's bay."

See also
National Register of Historic Places listings in Pueblo County, Colorado

References

External links

National Register of Historic Places in Pueblo County, Colorado
Buildings of the Atchison, Topeka and Santa Fe Railway